Alaskana is a New Latin term meaning of Alaska, used in taxonomy to denote species indigenous to or strongly associated with Alaska.

Fungi
Arthrobotrys alaskana, a mitosporic fungus in the family Orbiliaceae
Fuscopannaria alaskana, a lichenized fungus in the family Pannariaceae
Urocystis alaskana, a smut fungus in the family Urocystidiaceae
Xanthoria alaskana, a lichenized fungus in the family Teloschistaceae

Sea snails
Leptogyra alaskana, a sea snail in the family Melanodrymiidae
Onoba alaskana, a minute sea snail in the family Rissoidae
Setia alaskana, a minute sea snail in the family Rissoidae
Turbonilla alaskana, a species of sea snail in the family Pyramidellidae

Other
Androsace alaskana, a flowering plant in the family Primulaceae
Artemisia alaskana, a North American species of plants in the sunflower family
Caprella alaskana, a skeleton shrimp in the family Caprellidae
Isotoma alaskana, a springtail in the family Isotomidae
Lyonsiella alaskana, a saltwater clam in the family Verticordiidae
Phyllonorycter alaskana, a moth of the family Gracillariidae
Rhynchelmis alaskana, a microdrile oligochaete in the family Lumbriculida
Stellaria alaskana, a flowering plant in the family Caryophyllaceae

Synonyms
Sorbus alaskana, synonym of Sorbus scopulina, a species of rowan that is native to western North America
Volutomitra alaskana, synonym of Volutomitra groenlandica, a sea snail in the family Volutomitridae

See also
Acer alaskense